iStore is an authorised Apple retailer:
 Distribution for Apple iOS, MacOS, WatchOS and tvOS original products and services.
 A South African distributor and retailer of Apple products.